GRGDN is a Turkish music production and artist management company and record label based in Istanbul. The name of the company originates from the Turkish word gergedan which means rhinoceros.

It was founded in 2003 by OIART-graduated producer Haluk Kurosman and Hadi Elazzi, who had previously worked for such companies like Sire Records (Warner Music) or Sony Music Turkey. The company has its own recording studio in Ulus, Istanbul and does the management of several renowned Turkish artists.

In 2011 Haluk Kurosman parted ways with GRGDN to become a freelance producer.

Record label

GRGDN released the first album of Turkish rock band Gripin as an independent record label. Together with Sony BMG they released several other albums. The studio recordings usually take place at the company's own studio, supervised by Haluk Kurosman. The full list of albums published or co-published by GRGDN is as follows:

Artist management

The company undertook the management of several successful artists. Among others they manage maNga, who have received gold status for their album sales in Turkey and Emre Aydın, who has won several prestigious awards this year as "Best Newcomer".

The full list of GRGDN-managed artists is as follows:

 maNga
 Vega
 Gripin (until 2009)
 Göksel (until 2009)
 emreaydın (until 2010)
 Badem
 Cartel

References

External links
 GRGDN Official Site

 GRGDN MySpace

Turkish record labels
Record labels established in 2003
Music production companies
Talent managers
Music organizations based in Turkey